Gongylidium is a genus of sheet weavers that was first described by Anton Menge in 1868.  it contains three species, found in Asia and Europe: G. baltoroi, G. rufipes, and G. soror.

See also
 List of Linyphiidae species (A–H)

References

Araneomorphae genera
Linyphiidae
Palearctic spiders
Spiders of China